JS Matsuyuki (DD-130) is a  of the Japan Maritime Self-Defense Force.

Development and design 
The Hatsuyuki class were designed as multi-purpose ships, with a balanced armament and sensor fit, so that the ships could carry out anti-submarine and anti-surface ship operations while being capable of defending themselves against air attack. A hangar and flight deck are carried for a single helicopter, which was initially the Mitsubishi HSS-2, a license-built Sikorsky Sea King, later replaced by Mitsubishi H-60s (licensed Sikorsky S-70s), with the Canadian Beartrap haul-down system fitted to ease operations of large helicopters.

An octuple Mk 112 launcher for ASROC anti-submarine missiles is fitted forward, while additional close-in anti-submarine armament is provided by two triple 324-mm torpedo-tubes for Mark 46 anti-submarine torpedoes.

The initial anti-aircraft armament consisted of a Sea Sparrow surface-to-air missile launcher aft, with an OTO Melara 76 mm gun forward. Eight Harpoon anti-ship missiles are carried in two quadruple mounts abaft the ship's funnel.

Construction and career 
Matsuyuki was laid down on 20 January 1987 and launched on 4 June 1988 by Hitachi Zosen Corporation, Maizuru. She was commissioned on 31 January 1990.

Maritime Self-Defense Force 21st Air Group 25th Air Corps (Ōminato) patrol helicopter SH-60J (No. 8279) (Captain Masahiko Miyanaga 3)  touched the main rotor to the side wall of the left vault of Matsuyuki and crashed. In this incident, Masahiko Miyanaga was killed, and Matsuyuki also damaged the side wall of the port hangar, and after transferring the training executive to Kashima, she left the training fleet for repair, but for about two weeks. After repairing, the destroyer rejoined the training fleet again.

From 15 January to 2 March 2016, she participated in the International Fleet Review Ceremony sponsored by the Indian Navy and the Japan-US-Australia Joint Overseas Cruise Training.

She was retired on 7 April 2021.

Gallery

References 

Asagiri-class destroyers
Ships built by IHI Corporation
1984 ships